Lieutenant-Colonel Victor Buller Turner  (17 January 1900 – 7 August 1972) was a British Army officer and an English recipient of the Victoria Cross (VC) during the Second World War, the highest award for gallantry in the face of the enemy that can be awarded to members of British and other Commonwealth forces. 

His older brother, Alexander Turner, received a posthumous VC during the First World War.

Early life
Victor Buller Turner was born in Reading, Berkshire on 17 January 1900. He was the son of Major Charles Turner of the Royal Berkshire Regiment of the British Army and his second wife, Jane Elizabeth, the only daughter of Admiral Sir Alexander Buller, a Royal Navy officer. He was the younger brother of Alexander Buller Turner VC and was also related to General Sir Redvers Buller VC.

Turner was educated at Parkside School, Surrey, Wellington College.

Military career

1918–1939
After attending the Royal Military College, Sandhurst, Turner was commissioned as a second lieutenant in the Rifle Brigade in 1918. 

He served in the campaign in Iraq in 1919–20, was promoted to major in 1938.

He lived at Thatcham House before moving to Norfolk  after the war and retired from the army in 1949.

1939–1942
Turner was promoted to temporary Lieutenant-Colonel in 1942 while serving in the Middle East, before the action in which he was awarded the VC.

Victoria Cross
On 27 October 1942, at El Aqqaqir (Kidney feature), Western Desert, Egypt, during the Second Battle of El Alamein, Lieutenant-Colonel Turner was commanding a battalion of the Rifle Brigade. After overcoming a German position, the battalion fought off desperate counter-attacks by 90 tanks, destroying or immobilising more than 50 of them. During the action, one of the 6-pounder guns was left with only one officer and a sergeant, so Colonel Turner joined them as loader, and between them they destroyed another five tanks. Not until the last tank had been repulsed did he consent to having a wound in his head attended to.

The citation for his award was published in the London Gazette on 20 November 1942 and reads as follows: 

Turner's Victoria Cross is displayed at the Royal Green Jackets (Rifles) Museum in Winchester, England.

1942–45

Post-war
In 1950, Turner was appointed to the Royal Household, with a post in the ceremonial King's Bodyguard of the Yeomen of the Guard and rose to be "Clerk of the Cheque and Adjutant" of the Guard in 1955. 

He was appointed a Commander of the Royal Victorian Order (CVO) in 1966 in connection with his services to the Royal Household and was promoted to Lieutenant of the Queen's Bodyguard in 1967.

Notes

References
British VCs of World War 2 (John Laffin, 1997)
Monuments to Courage: Victoria Cross Monuments and Headstones (David Harvey, 1999)
The Register of the Victoria Cross (This England, 1997)

External links
Lieutenant Colonel V.B. Turner in The Art of War exhibition at the UK National Archives
Location of grave and VC medal (Norfolk)

A Brief Overview of Lieutenant Colonel Turner 

1900 births
1972 deaths
Rifle Brigade officers
Commanders of the Royal Victorian Order
People from Reading, Berkshire
People from Thatcham
British Army personnel of World War II
British World War II recipients of the Victoria Cross
British Army recipients of the Victoria Cross
British military personnel of the Iraqi revolt of 1920
People educated at Wellington College, Berkshire
Graduates of the Royal Military College, Sandhurst
Victor
Military personnel from Reading, Berkshire
People educated at Parkside School, Cobham